Jonathan Dinzeyi (born 13 October 1999) is an English professional footballer who plays as a centre-back.

Career
Dinzeyi was born in Islington and grew-up in Enfield where he attended Enfield Grammar School. He played for Chettle Court Rangers youth team in Haringey before joining the Tottenham Hotspur academy. He was released near the end of July 2020. A month later Arsenal signed the player into their youth system. On 31 August 2021, Carlisle United loaned Dinzeyi from Arsenal. He made his debut in a 2–0 defeat to Forest Green Rovers on 2 October 2021. Dinzeyi made two further appearances for Carlisle before Arsenal exercised their option and recalled him early from his loan on 3 January 2022. In June 2022, it was announced that Dinzeyi would be released upon the expiry of his contract at the end of the month.

Personal life
Born in England, Dinzeyi is of Congolese descent.

References

External links
 

1999 births
Living people
Footballers from Islington (district)
English footballers
English sportspeople of Democratic Republic of the Congo descent
Association football defenders
Tottenham Hotspur F.C. players
Arsenal F.C. players
Carlisle United F.C. players
English Football League players
Black British sportspeople